The Pyetrykaw District, Pietrykaŭski Rajon is a district of the Gomel Region, in Belarus.

Notable residents 

 Aleś Dudar (1904, Navasiolki village - 1937), Belarusian poet, critic, translator and a victim of Stalin's purges

 Mikhail Marynich(1940, Staryja Haloǔčycy village — 2014), Belarusian diplomat, public figure and political prisoner

Notes

 
Districts of Gomel Region